Alessandro Scottà (born 23 March 1969) is an Italian freestyle skier. He competed in the men's aerials event at the 1994 Winter Olympics.

References

External links
 

1969 births
Living people
Italian male freestyle skiers
Olympic freestyle skiers of Italy
Freestyle skiers at the 1994 Winter Olympics
People from Vittorio Veneto
Sportspeople from the Province of Treviso
20th-century Italian people